In September 2016, the International Union for Conservation of Nature (IUCN) listed 643 endangered fish species. Of all evaluated fish species, 4.2% are listed as endangered. 
The IUCN also lists ten fish subspecies as endangered.

Of the subpopulations of fishes evaluated by the IUCN, 24 species subpopulations have been assessed as endangered.

For a species to be considered endangered by the IUCN it must meet certain quantitative criteria which are designed to classify taxa facing "a very high risk of extinction". An even higher risk is faced by critically endangered species, which meet the quantitative criteria for endangered species. Critically endangered fishes are listed separately. There are 1098 fish species which are endangered or critically endangered.

Additionally 3191 fish species (21% of those evaluated) are listed as data deficient, meaning there is insufficient information for a full assessment of conservation status. As these species typically have small distributions and/or populations, they are intrinsically likely to be threatened, according to the IUCN. While the category of data deficient indicates that no assessment of extinction risk has been made for the taxa, the IUCN notes that it may be appropriate to give them "the same degree of attention as threatened taxa, at least until their status can be assessed".

This is a complete list of endangered fish species and subspecies evaluated by the IUCN. Species and subspecies which have endangered subpopulations (or stocks) are indicated.

Cartilaginous fishes

Chondrichthyes includes sharks, rays, skates, and saw-fish. There are 124 cartilaginous fishes classified as endangered by the IUCN.

Prickly sharks 

 Bramble shark (Echinorhinus brucus)

Carpet sharks 

 Whale shark (Rhincodon typus)
 Pacific nurseshark (Ginglymostoma unami)
 Zebra shark (Stegostoma tigrinum)
 Hasselt's bambooshark (Chiloscyllium hasselti)

Ground sharks 

 Bonnethead (Sphyrna tiburo)
 Winghead shark (Eusphyrna blochii)
 Happy Eddie (Haploblepharus edwardsii)
 Honeycomb Izak (Holohalaelurus favus)
 African spotted catshark (Holohalaelurus punctuatus)
 Blackspotted catshark (Halaelurus buergeri)
 Grey reef shark (Carcharhinus amblyrhynchos)
 Caribbean reef shark (Carcharhinus perezi)
 Dusky shark (Carcharhinus obscurus)
 Smoothtooth blacktip shark (Carcharhinus leiodon)
 Whitenose shark (Nasolamia velox)
 Blacknose shark (Carcharhinus acronotus)
 Night shark (Carcharhinus signatus)
 Sharptooth lemon shark (Negaprion acutidens)
 Sandbar shark (Carcharhinus plumbeus)
 Whitecheek shark (Carcharhinus dussumieri)
 Borneo broadfin shark (Lamiopsis tephrodes)
 Broadfin shark (Lamiopsis temminckii)
 Venezuelan dwarf smoothhound (Mustelus minicanis)
 Spotless smoothhound (Mustelus griseus)
 Indonesian houndshark (Hemitriakis indroyonoi)
 Banded houndshark (Triakis scyllium)
 Starspotted smoothhound (Mustelus manazo)
 Japanese topeshark (Hemitriakis japanica)
 Smalleye smoothhound (Mustelus higmani)
 Common smoothhound (Mustelus mustelus)
 Sharpfin houndshark (Hemitriakis acutipinna)
 Straight-tooth weaselshark (Paragaleus tengi)
 Atlantic weaselshark (Paragaleus pectoralis)

Mackerel sharks 

 Shortfin mako (Isurus oxyrinchus)
 Longfin mako (Isurus paucus)
 Pelagic thresher (Alopias pelagicus)
 Basking shark (Cetorhinus maximus)

Dogfishes 
 Gulper shark (Centrophorus granulosus)
 Dumb gulper shark (Centrophorus harrissoni)
 Blackfin gulper shark (Centrophorus isodon)
 African gulper shark (Centrophorus lesliei)
 Longfin gulper shark (Centrophorus longipinnis)
 Leafscale gulper shark (Centrophorus squamosus)
 Mosaic gulper shark (Centrophorus tessellatus)
 Little gulper shark (Centrophorus uyato)
 Angular roughshark (Oxynotus centrina)
 Japanese shortnose spurdog (Squalus brevirostris)
 Greeneye spurdog (Squalus chloroculus)
 Taiwan spurdog (Squalus formosus)
 Japanese spurdog (Squalus japonicus)
 Shortspine spurdog (Squalus mitsukurii)

Angel sharks

Species

Skates 
 Eyespot skate (Atlantoraja cyclophora)
 La Plata skate (Atlantoraja platana)
 Graytail skate (Bathyraja griseocauda)
 Mottled skate (Beringraja pulchra)
 Grey skate (Dipturus canutus)
 Yellownose skate (Dipturus chilensis)
 Maugean skate (Dipturus maugeanus)
 Roughskin skate (Dipturus trachydermus)
 Sandy skate (Leucoraja circularis)
 Winter skate (Leucoraja ocellata)
 Twineye skate (Raja ocellifera)
 Rough skate (Raja radula)
 Undulate skate (Raja undulata)
 Bottlenose skate (Rostroraja alba)

Rays 

 Giant manta ray (Mobula birostris)
 Spinetail devil ray (Mobula mobular)
 Atlantic devil ray (Mobula hypostoma)
 Bentfin devil ray (Mobula thurstoni)
 Shortfin devil ray (Mobula kuhlii)
 Longhorned pygmy devil ray (Mobula eregoodoo)
 Chilean devil ray (Mobula tarapacana)
 Ornate eagle ray (Aetomylaeus vespertilio)
 Ocellate eagle ray (Aetobatus ocellatus)
 Whitespotted eagle ray (Aetobatus narinari)
 Longhead eagle ray (Aetobatus flagellum)
 Mottled eagle ray (Aetomylaeus maculatus)
 Giant freshwater whipray (Urogymnus polylepis)
 White-edge whipray (Fluvitrygon signifer)
 Coach whipray (Himantura uarnak)
 Bleeker's whipray (Pateobatis bleekeri)
 Sharpnose whipray (Maculabatus macrura)
 Marbled whipray (Fluvitrygon oxyrhynchus)
 Round whipray (Maculabatus pastinacoides)
 Roughback whipray (Fluvitrygon kittapongi)
 Whitespotted whipray (Maculabatis gerrardi)
 Tubemouth whipray (Urogymnus lobistoma)
 Whitenose whipray (Himantura uarnacoides)
 Javan whipray (Bevitrygon javaensis)
 Honeycomb whipray (Himantura undulata)
 Narrow cowtail ray (Pastinachus gracilicaudus)
 Roughnose cowtail ray (Pastinachus solocirostris)
 Javanese cownose ray (Rhinoptera javanica)
 Oman cownose ray (Rhinoptera jayakari)
 Mekong stingray (Hemitrygon laosensis)
 Seret's butterfly ray (Gymnura sereti)
 Spiny butterfly ray (Gymnura altaveri)
 Zonetail butterfly ray (Gymnura zonura)
 Groovebelly stingray (Dasyatis hypostigma)
 Atlantic chupare (Styracura schmardae)
 Coastal stingaree (Urolophus orarius)
 Raya Amazonica (Potamotrygon tigrina)
 Indian sharpnose ray (Telatrygon crozieri)
 Venezuelan round ray (Urotrygon venezuelae)
 Chinese stingray (Hemitrygon sinensis)
 Large-eye stingray (Hypanus marinae)

Sawfish and guitarfish 

 Greyspot guitarfish (Acroteriobatus leucospilus)
 Knifetooth sawfish (Anoxypristis cuspidata)
 Dwarf sawfish (Pristis clavata)
 Chola guitarfish (Pseudobatos percellens)
 Borneo guitarfish (Rhinobatos borneensis)
 Ringed guitarfish (Rhinobatos hynnicephalus)
 Indonesian guitarfish (Rhinobatos penggali)
 Shortnose guitarfish (Zapteryx brevirostris)

Torpedo rays 

 Chinese fanray (Platyrhina sinensis)
 Tonkin numbfish (Narcine prodorsalis)
 West African torpedo (Torpedo mackayana)
 Rosette torpedo (Torpedo bauchotae)
 Aden torpedo (Torpedo adenensis)

Ray-finned fishes 
Subpopulations
Squatina guggenheim  (1 subpopulation)

Mackerel sharks

Subpopulations
Basking shark (Cetorhinus maximus) (2 subpopulations)
Porbeagle (Lamna nasus) (1 subpopulation)

Rays and skates

Ground sharks

Species

Subpopulations
Sicklefin lemon shark (Negaprion acutidens) (1 subpopulation)
Scalloped hammerhead (Sphyrna lewini) (3 subpopulations)

Carpet sharks

Whale shark (Rhincodon typus)

Squaliformes

Species
Dumb gulper shark (Centrophorus harrissoni)
Subpopulations
Spiny dogfish (Squalus acanthias) (2 subpopulations)

Lampreys

Turkish brook lamprey (Lampetra lanceolata)

Ray-finned fishes

There are 592 species, ten subspecies, and three subpopulations of ray-finned fish assessed as endangered.

Salmoniformes

Species

Subpopulations
Sockeye salmon (Oncorhynchus nerka) (12 subpopulations)

Silversides

Toothcarps

There are 65 species and nine subspecies of toothcarp assessed as endangered.

Pupfish

Species

Subspecies
Dead Sea toothcarp (Aphanius dispar richardsoni)

Nothobranchiids

Species

Subspecies

Poeciliids

Other toothcarp species

Cypriniformes

Cypriniformes includes carps, minnows, loaches and relatives. There are 245 species in the order Cypriniformes assessed as endangered.

Ellopostomatids

Ellopostoma mystax

Hillstream loaches

True loaches

Cyprinids

Psilorhynchids 

Psilorhynchus microphthalmus

Suckers

Osmeriformes

Species

Subspecies
Plecoglossus altivelis ryukyuensis

Catfishes

Perciformes

There are 133 species and one subpopulation in the order Perciformes assessed as endangered.

Cichlids

Percids

Epinephelids

Gobies

Other Perciformes

Species

Subpopulations
Swordfish (Xiphias gladius) (1 subpopulation)

Osteoglossiformes

Characiformes

Tetraodontiformes

Other ray-finned fishes

Species

Subpopulations
White sturgeon (Acipenser transmontanus) (1 subpopulation)

Hagfishes

Myxine paucidens
Paramyxine taiwanae

See also 
 Lists of IUCN Red List endangered species
 List of least concern fishes
 List of near threatened fishes
 List of vulnerable fishes
 List of critically endangered fishes
 List of recently extinct fishes
 List of data deficient fishes
 Sustainable seafood advisory lists and certification

References 

 01
Fish
Endangered
Endangered fish
Endangered fishes
Fish